Blažević  is a common Croatian last name, originating from the masculine first name Blaž, a form of the name Blaise.

It is one of the most common surnames in three counties of Croatia.

It may refer to:

 Ante Blažević (born 1996), Croatian football player
 Davor Blažević (born 1993), Croatian-Swedish football player
 Goran "Šiljo" Blažević (born 1986), Croatian football player
 Ivan Blažević (born 1992), Croatian football player
 Igor Blažević (born 1963), Czech human rights campaigner of Bosnian Croat origin
 Jakov Blažević (1912–1996), Croatian politician during Yugoslavia
 Miroslav "Ćiro" Blažević (born 1935), Croatian football manager of Bosnian Croat origin
 Roko Blažević (born 2000), Croatian singer
 Valentina Blažević (born 1994), Croatian handball player
 Vlatko Blažević (born 1994), Croatian football player

References 

Croatian surnames
Patronymic surnames